The Museum of the Great Patriotic War, also known as the Victory Museum (Russian: Музей Победы), is a history museum located in Moscow at Poklonnaya Gora. The building was designed by architect Anatoly Polyansky. Work on the museum began on March 3, 1986, and the museum was opened to the public on May 9, 1995. The museum features exhibits and memorials concerning the Eastern Front of World War II, known in Russia as the "Great Patriotic War".

Exhibits
The museum features 14,143 square meters of exhibit space for permanent collections and an additional 5,500 square meters for temporary exhibits. Near the entry to the museum is the Hall of Commanders, which features a decorative "Sword and Shield of Victory" and bronze busts of recipients of the Order of Victory, the highest military honor awarded by the Soviet Union.

Setting

The museum is set in Victory Park, a 2,424-hectare park on Poklonnaya Hill. The park features a large, paved plaza, fountains, and open space where military vehicles, cannons, and other apparatus from World War II are displayed. Also in the park are the Holocaust Memorial Synagogue, the Church of St. George, the Moscow Memorial Mosque, a triumphal arch, an obelisk, and a number of sculptures.

References

External links

 Official Site (in Russian)
 Central Museum of the Great Patriotic War at Museums of Russia (in Russian)
 Photos of the museum
 Museum of the Great Patriotic War at Google Cultural Institute

Museums in Moscow
World War II museums in Russia
Military and war museums in Russia
History museums in Russia